Ted Bates may refer to:

Ted Bates (American football) (born 1936), American football player
Ted Bates (footballer) (1918–2003), English footballer and manager with Southampton F.C.
Ted Bates (executive) (1901–1972), American advertising executive and founder of Bates Worldwide
Ted Bates (advertising firm), an advertising agency founded by Ted Bates in 1940
Ted Bates (politician) (1926–2011), mayor of Warren, Michigan

See also
Edward Bates (disambiguation)